Scott Edwards is an English male indoor bowler.

Bowls career
He has qualified for the World Indoor Bowls Championships on six occasions in 2013, 2018, 2019, 2020, 2021 and 2022. Edwards reached the quarter final in 2019 losing out to Les Gillett.

In the International Open he has knocked out two world champions, in 2017 he defeated Paul Foster and in 2018 he defeated Mark Dawes. He finished the 2017/18 season ranked number 1 in the Open Singles Circuit with a record points score of 490. In 2018/19 he was ranked PBA European No.1

He was the National singles runner-up in 2010 during the Men's National Championships. He is two times winner of the Bournemouth Open.

As of 2021, he was the World No.17 indoors, Open Singles Circuit No.3 and PBA European No.2.

UK Career wins
Bournemouth Open Singles Champion twice (2 years running)
Worthing Pavilion Open Singles Champion twice
Atherley Open Singles Champion (outdoor)
Cheltenham Open Singles Champion
Hove Open Singles Champion
Worthing Open Singles Champion
Salisbury Open Singles Champion
Adur Open Singles Champion
Welford Open Singles Champion
Loddon Vale Open Singles Champion
Dolphin Open Singles Champion
Five Rivers Open Singles Champion
Atherley Open Singles Champion (indoor)
Daventry Open Singles Champion
North Wilts Open Singles Champion
Seven consecutive Open pairs titles over 3 years at the Bournemouth Open, Worthing Open and Hove Open

Occupation
Scott was a full time professional poker player between the years of 2010 and 2016.

References

Living people
1973 births
English male bowls players